Walikalage Sarath Peiris Jayawardene, usually known as Sarath Jayawardene (born 22 July 1969) is a Sri Lankan cricketer who has also played for Malaysia. A right-handed batsman and right-arm medium pace bowler, he had two stints playing first-class cricket in Sri Lanka, one from 1989 to 2002 and the other from 2005 to 2007. He played for Malaysia in 2003 and 2004.

Biography

Initial Sri Lankan first-class career
Born in Panadura in 1969, Jayawardene made his first-class debut for Panadura Sports Club against Nomads Sports Club in March 1989. He continued playing for his home town club until 1995, when he moved to Antonians Sports Club. He also played first-class cricket for Western Province South, Western Province Suburbs and a Sri Lanka Board Under-23s XI in the same time period. His List A debut came in January 1993 when he played for Panadura Sports Club against Nondescripts Cricket Club.

He played his first first-class match for Antonians Sports Club against Sinhalese Sports Club in November 1995 and continued to play for them until 1997. He played just one List A match for them in this time. He returned to Panadura Sports Club in 1999 and played for them until 2002, when he began to play for Malaysia.

Malaysian international career
He made his debut for Malaysia in a match against the ECB National Academy in February 2003. He then played in that year's Stan Nagaiah Trophy series against Singapore. He played for a Malaysian Cricket Association Invitation XI against England A in February 2004, also playing in the Stan Nagaiah Trophy for a second time the same month.

He played two first-class matches for Malaysia throughout 2004, playing Nepal and the UAE in the ICC Intercontinental Cup. The match against the UAE was his last for Malaysia. He played matches in the 2004 ACC Trophy against Kuwait and Saudi Arabia between the two Intercontinental Cup matches.

Return to Sri Lanka
He returned to play for Panadura Sports Club in October 2005 when he played a Twenty20 match against Chilaw Marians Cricket Club. After two further Twenty20 matches, he returned to first-class cricket with them in December 2005 with a match against Moors Sports Club.

He continued playing for Panadura Sports Club throughout 2006 and into 2007, his last first-class match to date coming against Lankan Cricket Club in February 2007. He most recently played for Panadura in a Twenty20 match against Tamil Union Cricket and Athletic Club in March 2007.

References

1969 births
Living people
Malaysian cricketers
Sri Lankan cricketers
Antonians Sports Club cricketers
Panadura Sports Club cricketers
Sri Lankan emigrants to Malaysia
Sri Lankan expatriates in Malaysia